The  is an incomplete two-lane national expressway in Shizuoka Prefecture. It is owned and operated primarily by the Ministry of Land, Infrastructure, Transport and Tourism (MLIT), but has a short section maintained and tolled by the Central Nippon Expressway Company at its northern terminus with the Tōmei Expressway. The route is signed E70 under MLIT's  "2016 Proposal for Realization of Expressway Numbering."

Route description

As of February 2019, the expressway exists as two separate sections that are linked by the Izu Chuodo and Shuzenji Road, roads tolled by the Shizuoka Prefecture Road Corporation. Shuzenji Road is officially a branch line of the Izu-Jūkan Expressway while Izu Chuodo is not. The northern section links the Tōmei Expressway and nearby Shin-Tōmei Expressway to Kannami to the southeast. In Kannami, the road ends, leading to the Izu Chuodo. When completed the main line of the expressway will bypass the toll roads, running to the east of them. The southern section of the expressway begins at a junction with the Shuzenji Road in the northern part of the city of Izu and travels south, parallel to Japan National Route 136. The expressway has a junction with Route 136 near the center of Izu after tunneling through the hills around the city. This junction, Tsukigase Interchange, currently serves as the southern terminus of the expressway.

History
The Izu-Jūkan Expressway was first opened as a  section of expressway on 19 September 1992 between Kumasaka and Shuzenji interchanges. Since then it has been it has been expanded in stages, with the most recent expansion being a  section opened on 26 January 2019 between Ōdai and Tsukigase interchanges.

See also

Izu Chuodo
Shuzenji Road

References

External links

 Ministry of Land, Infrastructure and Transport: Chūbu Regional Development Bureau 

Roads in Shizuoka Prefecture
Expressways in Japan